The Royce Consultancy the UK's leading privately held pharmaceutical sales representative recruitment and contract sales organisation (CSO).

Royce was founded in 1983 and is the largest healthcare and pharmaceutical recruitment company in the UK.  Their services range from medical representatives to NHS management roles and from nurse advisor to healthcare sales positions.  In August 1998 Royce was acquired by Quintiles but continues to operate under the Royce brand alongside Quintiles’ brand name of Innovex. They are an important brand within the UK as they are winners of the Pharmatimes "Recruiter of the Year" 2008 award which is significant as PharaTimes are a recognised and established independent publication for the pharmaceutical, biotechnology and healthcare industries within the UK.

In recent years, portfolios have shifted from the primary care sector to specialist-driven markets such as oncology.  More than 40% of all UK hospital representative positions are now filled by Innovex/Royce. They have built more than 22 secondary or specialist teams in the UK.

References

Employment agencies of the United Kingdom
Organizations established in 1983
1983 establishments in the United Kingdom